The ASB Classic could refer to several tennis tournaments held in Auckland:

The women's WTA Auckland Open
The men's ATP Auckland Open